Thích is a name that Vietnamese monks and nuns take as their Buddhist surname to show affinity with the Buddha.

Notable Vietnamese monks with the name include:

Thích Huyền Quang (1919–2008), dissident and activist
Thích Quảng Độ (1928–2020), critic of the Vietnamese government
Thích Quảng Đức (1897–1963), who burned himself to death as a protest
Thích Nhất Hạnh (1926–2022), Zen teacher, author and peace activist
Thích Nhật Từ (born 1969), public speaker and author
Thích Thanh Từ, author and teacher
Thích Trí Quang (1924–2019), Mahayana leader of South Vietnam's Buddhist majority in 1963

See also
Thích Ca Phật Đài, temple in Vũng Tàu, Vietnam